Dipali Cunningham (born August 27, 1958) from Melbourne, Australia now she lives in New York City, USA is an ultramarathon woman runner. Dipali is a Disciple from the spiritual Master Sri Chinmoy over 30 years.

History 
She began multiday running in 1991 with the Sri Chinmoy 7 Day race in Flushing Meadow, Queens, New York.

Records 
Cunningham has won every edition of the Self-Transcendence 6 Day Race since it began in 1998. In 2009, she reset her own World 6 day road record.

 1993 1000-Mile Race -First Place (Australian record) - 15days+12:52:02 
 1997 1000 Mile Race-First Place (Australian record) - 13days+20:18:40 
 1998 women's world best on the road for six days with 504 miles.
 2001 women's world record on the road for six days with 510 miles.
 2004 women's age group 45-49 world best for six days with 479 miles.
 2009 women's world best on the road for six days with 513 miles.

References

External links
Dipali Cunningham page
 Video: Report, 1:30 - 2:40, New York Times
 Video: Sri Chinmoy Marathon Team, 2015
Report, 2010

Australian ultramarathon runners
Australian female long-distance runners
Devotees of Sri Chinmoy
Living people
1958 births
Australian expatriate sportspeople in the United States
Female ultramarathon runners